6-Acetoxydihydrotheaspirane is an organic compound. It is used as a flavoring agent in foods.

6-Acetoxydihydrotheaspirane is not found in nature. Its appearance is partly-liquid, partly-crystalline. It is not soluble in water, but is soluble in fats. It has been used in baked goods, instant coffee, condiments, relishes, and gravies. Tobacco companies use the chemical as well.

References

Acetate esters
Spiro compounds